Pressed wood, also known as presswood, is any engineered wood building and furniture construction material made from wood veneers, wood shavings and particles, sawdust or wood fibers bonded together with an adhesive under heat and pressure.

See also
 Fiberboard
 Glued laminated timber
 Hardboard
 Haskelite
 Laminated veneer lumber
 Masonite
 Medium-density fiberboard
 Oriented strand board
 Particle board
 Plywood

References 

Engineered wood